Football is the most popular sport in the Netherlands. Football was introduced to the Netherlands by Pim Mulier in the 19th century when in 1879, at the age of 14, he founded Haarlemsche Football Club. Over the next 30 years, football gained popularity in the Netherlands and the late 1890s and early 1900s saw the foundation of many new clubs, notably Sparta Rotterdam in 1888, which is the oldest professional football club in the country, AFC Ajax in 1900, Feyenoord Rotterdam in 1908, and PSV Eindhoven in 1913.

The Royal Dutch Football Association (KNVB) was founded on 8 December 1889 and joined FIFA in 1904 as one of the founding members alongside the Football Associations of Belgium, Denmark, France, Spain, Sweden, and Switzerland.

Professional football was introduced in 1954, with the establishment of the Dutch Professional Football Association (Nederlandse Beroeps Voetbal Bond, or NBVB). The first professional game was played on 14 August 1954 between Alkmaar '54 and SC Venlo. The KNVB had opposed professional football for a long time, but eventually submitted to pressure and merged with the NBVB in November 1954 to form a new football association and a new (professional) league.

From 1956, the top flight of Dutch football is the Eredivisie (literally Honorary Division). The second level is the Eerste Divisie (First Division). The third level is the Tweede Divisie (Second Division). Below that are two amateur divisions: the fourth level is the Derde Divisie (Third Division), formerly Topklasse, and the fifth level the Hoofdklasse. The Topklasse was launched in 2010, before that time promotion to or relegation from the Eerste Divisie was not possible. In 2016, the Topklasse was renamed Derde Divisie and the Tweede Divisie was revived.

The Netherlands is unique, for its well known men's and women's team are usually dressed in orange. They won the European Championship in 1988, and have competed in many European and World Cups. They finished second in the 1974,1978 and 2010 World Cups and third in the UEFA Euro 1976 and 2014 World Cup tournament. They have reached many finals (1974 World Cup, 1978 World Cup, Euro 1988, 2010 World Cup) and semi-finals (Euro 1976, 1998 World Cup, Euro 2000, Euro 2004, 2014 World Cup). The women's team also managed to reach the final in its just second FIFA Women's World Cup, where they reached the 2019 Women's World Cup but failed to win. This means the Netherlands is the second country in the world where both men's and women's teams reached the final of respective gender's World Cup yet failed to win both times, the other being Sweden.
The women won also the Women's Euro 2017.
Only the Netherlands and Germany have won both the men's and the women's European Championship.

Structure of the competition (from the 2016–17 season)

Structure of the competition (until the 2015–16 season) 

Zesde Klasse was abolished in 2015.

Structure of the competition (until the 2009–10 season) 

Zevende Klasse was abolished in 2010.

Competition finals

The following 24 European finals (club and international tournaments) took place at Dutch venues, or are scheduled to take place at them:
Those which involved a Dutch club are marked with an asterisk (*)

 1962 European Cup Final, Olympisch Stadion – (Attendance: 65,000)
 1963 European Cup Winners' Cup Final, De Kuip – (Attendance: 49,000)
 1968 European Cup Winners' Cup Final, De Kuip – (Attendance: 53,000)
 1972 European Cup Final,* De Kuip – (Attendance: 67,000)
 1973 European Super Cup,* Olympisch Stadion – second leg (Attendance: 25,000)
 1974 European Cup Winners' Cup Final, De Kuip – (Attendance: 4,000)
 1974 UEFA Cup Final,* De Kuip – second leg (Attendance: 59,317)
 1975 UEFA Cup Final,* Diekman Stadion – second leg (Attendance: 21,767)
 1977 European Cup Winners' Cup Final, Olympisch Stadion – (Attendance: 66,000)
 1978 UEFA Cup Final,* Philips Stadion – second leg (Attendance: 27,000)
 1981 UEFA Cup Final,* Olympisch Stadion – second leg (Attendance: 28,500)
 1982 European Cup Final, De Kuip – (Attendance: 46,000)
 1985 European Cup Winners' Cup Final, De Kuip – (Attendance: 38,500)
 1987 European Super Cup,* De Meer Stadium – first leg (Attendance: 27,000)
 1988 European Super Cup,* Philips Stadion – second leg (Attendance: 17,100)
 1991 European Cup Winners' Cup Final, De Kuip – (Attendance: 43,500)
 1992 UEFA Cup Final,* Olympisch Stadion – second leg (Attendance: 42,000)
 1995 UEFA Super Cup,* Olympisch Stadion – second leg (Attendance: 23,000)
 1997 UEFA Cup Winners' Cup Final, De Kuip – (Attendance: 52,000)
 1998 UEFA Champions League Final, Amsterdam Arena – (Attendance: 48,500)
 UEFA Euro 2000 Final, De Kuip – (Attendance: 50,000)
 2002 UEFA Cup Final,* De Kuip – (Attendance: 45,611)
 2006 UEFA Cup Final, Philips Stadion – (Attendance: 33,100)
 2013 UEFA Europa League Final, Amsterdam Arena (Attendance: 46,163)

Women's football

More woman play football than any other sport in the Netherlands.

Futsal 
The top division for Futsal in the Netherlands are the Futsal Eredivisie and the Futsal Eredivisie (women)

Largest Dutch football stadiums

See also
Royal Dutch Football Association
Netherlands national football team
Netherlands women's national football team
Eredivisie
KNVB Cup
Women's football in the Netherlands
BeNe League, the top women's league in both Belgium and the Netherlands

References

External links
 History of the KNVB 
 League321.com - Dutch football league tables, records & statistics database. 

 

lt:Nyderlandų futbolo sistema
ru:Система футбольных лиг Нидерландов